The Journal of Electroceramics is a peer-reviewed scientific journal that was established in 1997. It is published by Springer Science+Business Media on behalf of The Minerals, Metals & Materials Society. The editor-in-chief is Harry L. Tuller.

This journal covers research on electrical, optical, and magnetic ceramics, including silicon-electroceramic integration, nanotechnology, ceramic-polymer composites, grain boundary and defect engineering. Invited papers occasionally appear in the journal which provide information that encompasses significant progress and analysis of future trends in the various interdisciplinary sub-fields.

Abstracting and indexing 
The journal is abstracted and indexed in:

According to the Journal Citation Reports, the journal has a 2020 impact factor of 1.785.

References

External links 
 

English-language journals
Materials science journals
Publications established in 1997
Quarterly journals
Springer Science+Business Media academic journals